Pronola is a genus of moths in the family Arctiidae.

Species
 Pronola diffusa Schaus, 1899
 Pronola ectrocta Dognin, 1912
 Pronola fraterna Schaus, 1905
 Pronola magniplaga Schaus, 1899
 Pronola perdiffusa Dognin, 1912

References

Natural History Museum Lepidoptera generic names catalog

Lithosiini
Moth genera